Bruno Township is a township in Butler County, Kansas, USA.  As of the 2000 census, its population was 9,744.

Bruno Township was organized in 1873.

Geography
According to the USGS, it contains one cemetery, Andover.

The stream of Republican Creek runs through this township.

Further reading

References

 USGS Geographic Names Information System (GNIS)

External links
 City-Data.com

Townships in Butler County, Kansas
Townships in Kansas